is a kata of apparent Southern Chinese (Fujianese) origin that is considered to be the core of several styles, the most well-known being the Okinawan Karate styles of Uechi-Ryū and Gōjū-Ryū, as well as the Chinese martial arts of Fujian White Crane, Five Ancestors, Pangai-noon and the Tiger-Crane Combination style associated with Ang Lian-Huat. Tam Hon taught a style that was called simply "Saam Jin" (Cantonese for "Sanchin"). 

The name Sanchin, meaning "three battles/conflicts/wars" is usually interpreted as the battle to unify the mind, body, and spirit; however, there are other interpretations.

Uechi-Ryū practices a form of Sanchin with  "open spear hand" strikes, while the version used by many other styles such as Gōjū-Ryū and Chitō-ryū use a closed fist.

General information

Sanchin uses the  "sanchin stance" named for the kata. Practice of Sanchin seeks to develop the muscles and bones of the body to help the practitioner withstand blows from an opponent, while drilling the basic mechanics of a strike that depends on a stable base.

Sanchin is the first kata learned in Uechi-Ryū, while other styles may introduce it later. In Gōjū-Ryu, there are two Sanchin kata. The first, "Miyagi's Sanchin" or sanchin dai ichi, was created by Chōjun Miyagi. The second, "Higashionna's sanchin" or sanchin dai ni was taught with open hands, as in Uechi-Ryū, but later it was also revised to closed fists by Miyagi's co-student Juhatsu Kyoda, founder of Tōon-Ryū, and adopted by Chōjun Miyagi as well. This kata was adopted by other styles such as the later Okinawan style Isshin-Ryū and Kyokushin.

Some styles use a method of checking strength, posture, hand concentration during the performance of the kata called . This involves a range of techniques from hard strikes to check the tone of the student's muscles and overall strength to very soft and slow pushes and pulls to test the student's ability to react in order to maintain their position.

See also
 Karate stances
 Karate kata
 Tiger Crane Paired Form
 Naihanchi
 Shifu Alan Tinnion Checking a senior student Mr. John Webb - Three Battles - San Zhan 三 戰 對 套

References

Karate kata